Hirakawa may refer to:

Places
Hirakawa, Aomori, a Japanese city
Hirakawa, Yamaguchi

People with the surname
, Japanese voice actor
, Japanese sport shooter
, Japanese photographer
, Japanese racing driver
, Japanese football player

Japanese-language surnames